REIT or REIT India, is a wholly owned subsidiary  of Indian Telephone Industries Limited (ITI Limited), India's first public sector unit under Ministry of Communications, Government of India. Founded in 2017, today REIT has corporate offices in Bangalore, Amritsar, and Jammu. The tagline of REIT is ‘’’Ek REIT Suraksha Ki’’’ (Hindi: एक रीत सुरक्षा की). Implying the tradition of Security and Safety.

Jammu Suraksha Yojana 

Jammu Municipal Corporation is the first government body in the world concerning personal security of citizens. Jammu Suraksha Yojana is a collaborative initiative by REIT under ITI Limited and Jammu Municipal Corporation. It is intended to provide digital security and surveillance products to the citizen of Jammu at subsidized prices. The citizens can also avail life insurance in case of death.

Smart School Program 
REIT's  Smart School Program helps schools in India to upgrade their technology, including smart classrooms, broadcast systems for every class, digital entry at reception, integrated control rooms in campus, Wi-Fi campus, and school management Software.

Personal & Commercial Security 
REIT provides surveillance cameras in both wired and wireless configurations. Surveillance cameras can be accessed remotely on computers, smartphones, and tablets.

GPS Tracking System 

REIT created an web-enabled "Online Tracking System" to track and monitor the required devices, peoplem and transportation. REIT has launched tracking systems for various uses as Vehicle tracking system (VTS), Kids Tracking system, Cargo Tracking system, and transport tracking system (for professional transporters)

Vehicle tracking System, manufactured by REIT, is used to track all the normal vehicles like cars, buses, School vans, Army Vehicles, and other Lightweight and Heavy Weight Vehicles.

To take significant steps towards automating cargo transit facilitation, REIT has introduced a cargo tracking system to track the cargo container anywhere in the world.

REIT India has also started GPS based transporter services to transform the transportation industry with GPS technology to provide various services with ease of payment.

REIT has developed a Kid tracking system to track and keep the children secure and away from any mishappening. The Kid tracking system not only shows the current location but also provides area details and safe zones.

IOT Solutions 
REIT has deployed the Internet of things (IoT) to create safe cities, homes, businesses to remotely monitor private and public places by using smart surveillance devices. Surveillance devices, powered by IoT, also help determine the movements in the premises and false alarm recognition. REIT IOT Devices also play a significant role in preventing the loss of critical assets. REIT provides many security-related services like encryption, secure networking, session management, permissions, authentication, auditing, and validation.

IT Services and Maintenance 
REIT has introduced latest-generation security services for corporate and government organizations. The main services provided by REIT are Cloud computing, customized software, database security, maintenance and free technical assistance to the services.

References

External links 

 
 Indian Telephone Industries Limited

Companies based in Bangalore
Government-owned companies of India
Ministry of Communications and Information Technology (India)
2017 establishments in India